The Pianist is a 2002 biographical war drama film produced and directed by Roman Polanski, with a script by Ronald Harwood, and starring Adrien Brody. It is based on the autobiographical book The Pianist (1946), a Holocaust memoir by the Polish-Jewish pianist and composer Władysław Szpilman, a Holocaust survivor. The film was a co-production by France, the United Kingdom, Germany and Poland.

The Pianist premiered at the 2002 Cannes Film Festival on 24 May 2002, where it won the Palme d'Or, and went into wide release that September; the film received widespread critical acclaim, with critics lauding Polanski's direction, Brody's performance and Harwood's screenplay. At the 75th Academy Awards, the film won for Best Director (Polanski), Best Adapted Screenplay (Harwood), and Best Actor (Brody), and was nominated for four others, including Best Picture (it would lose out to Chicago). It also won the BAFTA Award for Best Film and BAFTA Award for Best Direction in 2003, and seven French Césars, including Best Picture, Best Director, and Best Actor for Brody. It was included in BBC's 100 Greatest Films of the 21st Century in 2016.

Plot
In September 1939, Władysław Szpilman, a Polish-Jewish pianist, is playing live on the radio in Warsaw when the station is destroyed during the German invasion of Poland. Hoping for a quick victory, Szpilman rejoices with his family at home when he learns that Britain and France have declared war on Germany, but the promised aid does not come. The fighting lasts for just over a month, with both the German and Soviet armies invading Poland at the same time on different fronts. Warsaw becomes part of the Nazi-controlled General Government. Jews are soon prevented from working or owning businesses and are also made to wear blue Star of David armbands.

By November 1940, Szpilman and his family are forced from their home into the isolated and overcrowded Warsaw Ghetto, where conditions only get worse. People starve, the SS guards are brutal, starving children are abandoned, and dead bodies are everywhere. On one occasion, the Szpilmans witness the SS kill an entire family in an apartment across the street during a round-up, including dumping an elderly man in a wheelchair out of a window three stories up.

On 16 August 1942, Szpilman and his family are about to be transported to Treblinka extermination camp as part of Operation Reinhard. However, a friend in the Jewish Ghetto Police recognizes Władysław at the Umschlagplatz and separates him from his family. He becomes a slave laborer and learns of a coming Jewish revolt. He helps the resistance by smuggling weapons into the ghetto, on one occasion narrowly avoiding a suspicious guard. Szpilman eventually manages to escape and goes into hiding with help from a Polish friend, Andrzej Bogucki, and his wife, Janina.

In April 1943, Szpilman watches from his window as the first of two uprisings, Warsaw Ghetto Uprising, which he aided, unfolds and ultimately fails. Soon thereafter, when a neighbor discovers Szpilman hiding in the flat, he is forced to flee to a second hiding place. His new hiding location is another vacant apartment, and it has a piano in it which he feels drawn to play; but he does not as he must keep quiet to avoid discovery. While in hiding at this location, malnutrition due to very limited food supplies takes effect; he loses weight and begins to suffer from jaundice.

In August 1944, during the Warsaw Uprising, the Home Army attacks a German building across the street from Szpilman's hideout. Tank shells hit the apartment, forcing him to flee. Over the course of the following months, Warsaw is destroyed. Szpilman is left alone to search desperately for shelter and supplies among the ruins. He eventually makes his way to a house where he finds a can of pickles. While trying to open it, he is discovered by Wehrmacht officer Wilm Hosenfeld, who learns that Szpilman is a pianist. He asks Szpilman to play on a grand piano in the house. The decrepit Szpilman manages to play Chopin's Ballade in G minor. Hosenfeld lets Szpilman hide in the attic of the empty house. While there, he is regularly supplied with food by the German officer.

In January 1945, the Germans are retreating from the Red Army. Hosenfeld meets Szpilman for the last time, and asks what his name is (on learning that it sounds the same as Spielmann [German for "play man"] he comments that it is "a good name for a pianist"); he then promises he will listen to him on Polish Radio after the war. He gives Szpilman his greatcoat (as well as a large parcel of food) to keep warm and leaves. In Spring 1945, former inmates of a Nazi concentration camp pass by a Soviet prisoner-of-war camp holding captured German soldiers and verbally abuse them. Hosenfeld, being one of the prisoners, overhears a released inmate lamenting over his former career as a violinist. He asks him whether he knows Szpilman, which he confirms, and Hosenfeld says he helped Szpilman and begs him to tell Szpilman he is in the camp. Later, the violinist and Szpilman reach the camp but find it abandoned.

After the war, Szpilman is back at the Polish Radio, where he performs Chopin's "Grand Polonaise brillante" to a large prestigious audience. A textual epilogue states that Szpilman died on July 6, 2000, at the age of 88, and all that is known of Hosenfeld is that he died in 1952 while still in Soviet captivity.

Cast

 Adrien Brody as Władysław Szpilman
 Thomas Kretschmann as Captain Wilm Hosenfeld
 Frank Finlay as Samuel Szpilman
 Maureen Lipman as Edwarda Szpilman
 Emilia Fox as Dorota
 Ed Stoppard as Henryk Szpilman
 Julia Rayner as Regina Szpilman
 Jessica Kate Meyer as Halina Szpilman
 Ronan Vibert as Andrzej Bogucki
 Ruth Platt as Janina Bogucki
 Andrew Tiernan as Szalas
 Michał Żebrowski as Jurek
 Roy Smiles as Itzhak Heller
 Richard Ridings as Mr. Lipa
 Daniel Caltagirone as Majorek
 Valentine Pelka as Dorota's Husband
 Zbigniew Zamachowski as Customer with Coins
 Ireneusz Machnicki as SS Officer
 Cezary Krajewski as SS Officer

Production

The story had deep connections with director Roman Polanski because he escaped from the Kraków Ghetto as a child after the death of his mother. He ended up living in a Polish farmer's barn until the war's end. His father almost died in the camps, but they reunited after the end of World War II.

Joseph Fiennes was Polanski's first choice for the lead role, but he turned it down due to a previous commitment to a theatrical role. Over 1,400 actors auditioned for the role of Szpilman at a casting call in London. Unsatisfied with all who tried, Polanski sought to cast Adrien Brody, whom he saw as ideal for the role during their first meeting in Paris.

Principal photography on The Pianist began on 9 February 2001 in Babelsberg Studio in Potsdam, Germany. The Warsaw Ghetto and the surrounding city were recreated on the backlot of Babelsberg Studio as they would have looked during the war. Old Soviet Army barracks were used to create the ruined city, as they were going to be destroyed anyway.

The first scenes of the film were shot at the old army barracks. Soon after, the film crew moved to a villa in Potsdam, which served as the house where Szpilman meets Hosenfeld. On 2 March 2001, filming then moved to an abandoned Soviet military hospital in Beelitz, Germany. The scenes that featured German soldiers destroying a Warsaw hospital with flamethrowers were filmed there. On 15 March, filming finally moved to Babelsberg Studios. The first scene shot at the studio was the complex and technically demanding scene in which Szpilman witnesses the ghetto uprising.

Filming at the studios ended on 26 March, and moved to Warsaw on 29 March. The rundown district of Praga was chosen for filming because of its abundance of original buildings. The art department built onto these original buildings, re-creating World War II-era Poland with signs and posters from the period. Additional filming also took place around Warsaw. The Umschlagplatz scene where Szpilman, his family, and hundreds of other Jews wait to be taken to the extermination camps was filmed at the National Defence University of Warsaw.

Principal photography ended in July 2001, and was followed by months of post-production in Paris.

Reception
The Pianist was widely acclaimed by critics, with Brody's performance, Harwood's screenplay, and Polanski's direction receiving special praise.  On review aggregator Rotten Tomatoes, the film holds an approval rating of 95% based on 185 reviews, with an average rating of 8.20/10. The website's critical consensus reads, "Well-acted and dramatically moving, The Pianist is Polanski's best work in years." On Metacritic, the film has a weighted average score of 85 out of 100, based on 40 critics, indicating "universal acclaim".

Roger Ebert of the Chicago Sun-Times gave the film three and a half stars out of four, noting that, "perhaps that impassive quality reflects what [director Roman] Polanski wants to say. ... By showing Szpilman as a survivor, but not a fighter or a hero—as a man who does all he can to save himself, but would have died without enormous good luck and the kindness of a few non-Jews—Polanski is reflecting ... his own deepest feelings: that he survived, but need not have, and that his mother died and left a wound that had never healed." 

Michael Wilmington of the Chicago Tribune said that the film "is the best dramatic feature I've seen on the Holocaust experience, so powerful a statement on war, inhumanity, and art's redemption that it may signal Polanski's artistic redemption". He would later go on to say that the film "illustrates that theme and proves that Polanski's own art has survived the chaos of his life—and the hell that war and bigotry once made of it". 

Richard Schickel of Time magazine called it a "raw, unblinkable film", and said that, "We admire this film for its harsh objectivity and refusal to seek our tears, our sympathies." 

Mick LaSalle of the San Francisco Chronicle said that the film "contains moments of irony, of ambiguity, and of strange beauty, as when we finally get a look at Warsaw and see a panorama of destruction, a world of color bombed into black-and-white devastation". He also said that, "In the course of showing us a struggle for survival, in all its animal simplicity, Polanski also gives us humanity, in all its complexity." 

A.O. Scott of The New York Times said that Szpilman "comes to resemble one of Samuel Beckett's gaunt existential clowns, shambling through a barren, bombed-out landscape clutching a jar of pickles. He is like the walking punchline to a cosmic jest of unfathomable cruelty." He also felt that "Szpilman's encounter, in the war's last days, with a music-loving German officer, "courted sentimentality by associating the love of art with moral decency, an equation the Nazis themselves, steeped in Beethoven and Wagner, definitively refuted".

Home media
The Pianist was released digitally on 27 May 2003 in a double-sided disc Special Edition DVD, with the film on one side and special features on the other. Some Bonus Material included a making-of, interviews with Brody, Polanski, and Harwood, and clips of Szpilman playing the piano. The Polish DVD edition included an audio commentary track by production designer Starski and director of photography Edelman.

Universal Studios Home Entertainment released the film on HD-DVD on 8 January 2008 with extras comprising the featurette "A Story of Survival" and rare footage of the real Władysław Szpilman playing his piano, as well as additional interviews with Adrien Brody and other crew.

Optimum Home Entertainment released The Pianist to the European market on Blu-ray as part of their StudioCanal Collection on 13 September 2010, the film's second release on Blu-ray. The first was troublesome due to issues with subtitles; the initial BD lacked subtitles for spoken German dialogue. Optimum later rectified this, but the initial release also lacked notable special features. The StudioCanal Collection version includes an extensive Behind the Scenes look, as well as several interviews with the makers of the film and Szpilman's relatives.

Music

 The piano piece heard at the beginning of the film is Chopin's Nocturne in C-sharp minor Lento con gran espressione, Op. posth.
 The piano piece that is heard being played by a next door neighbour while Szpilman was in hiding at an apartment is also an arrangement of Umówiłem się z nią na dziewiątą.
 The piano music heard in the abandoned house when Szpilman had just discovered a hiding place in the attic is the Piano Sonata No. 14 (Moonlight Sonata) by Beethoven. It would later be revealed that German officer Hosenfeld was the pianist. The German composition juxtaposed with the mainly Polish/Chopin selection of Szpilman.
 The piano piece played when Szpilman is confronted by Hosenfeld is Chopin's Ballade in G minor, Op. 23, but the version played in the movie was shortened (the entire piece lasts about 10 minutes).
 The cello piece heard at the middle of the film, played by Dorota, is the Prelude from Bach's Cello Suite No. 1.
 The piano piece heard at the end of the film, played with an orchestra, is Chopin's Grande Polonaise brillante, Op. 22.
 Shots of Szpilman's hands playing the piano in close-up were performed by Polish classical pianist Janusz Olejniczak (b. 1952), who also performed on the soundtrack.
 Since Polanski wanted the film to be as realistic as possible, any scene showing Brody playing was actually his playing overdubbed by recordings performed by Olejniczak. In order for Brody's playing to look like it was at the level of Szpilman's, he spent many months prior to and during the filming practising so that his keystrokes on the piano would convince viewers that Brody himself was playing.

Accolades

See also
 Robinson Crusoes of Warsaw – Szpilman was one of the most notable persons to remain in Warsaw after its destruction by the Nazis and before its liberation by the Red Army in January 1945.
 List of Holocaust films

References

External links
 
 
 
 
 Wladyslaw Szpilman's personal Website: The Pianist - The book
 Szpilman's Warsaw: The History behind The Pianist at the United States Holocaust Memorial Museum
 The Pianist at culture.pl

Władysław Szpilman
2002 films
2002 biographical drama films
2000s war drama films
French biographical drama films
French war drama films
German biographical drama films
German war drama films
Polish biographical drama films
Polish war drama films
British biographical drama films
British war drama films
2000s English-language films
Polish-language films
2000s German-language films
2000s Russian-language films
Best Film César Award winners
Films scored by Wojciech Kilar
Films about pianos and pianists
Films about classical music and musicians
Films about Jews and Judaism
Films based on biographies
Films directed by Roman Polanski
Films produced by Roman Polanski
Films featuring a Best Actor Academy Award-winning performance
Films featuring a Best Actor César Award-winning performance
Films set in Poland
Films set in Warsaw
Films set in 1939
Films set in 1940
Films set in 1942
Films set in 1943
Films set in 1944
Films set in 1945
Films shot in Poland
Films whose director won the Best Directing Academy Award
Films whose writer won the Best Adapted Screenplay Academy Award
Holocaust films
Jewish Polish history
Musical films based on actual events
Films about Nazism
Palme d'Or winners
World War II films based on actual events
Babelsberg Studio films
StudioCanal films
BAFTA winners (films)
Best Film BAFTA Award winners
Films whose director won the Best Direction BAFTA Award
Films whose director won the Best Director César Award
Films produced by Alain Sarde
Czech Lion Awards winners (films)
English-language French films
English-language German films
English-language Polish films
Films with screenplays by Ronald Harwood
2002 drama films
German prison films
Golden Eagle Award (Russia) for Best Foreign Language Film winners
British World War II films
French World War II films
German World War II films
Polish World War II films
2000s British films
2000s French films
2000s German films
Films about Polish resistance during World War II